Tamisian (also Romanized as Tamīsīān, Tamesīān, Tamīsīyān, and Tamīzīān) is a village in Tarrud Rural District, in the Central District of Damavand County, Tehran Province, Iran. At the 2006 census, its population was 107, in 36 families.

References 

Populated places in Damavand County